The 1907 West Virginia Mountaineers football team was an American football team that represented West Virginia University as an independent during the 1907 college football season. In its first and only season under head coach Clarence W. Russell, the team compiled a 6–4 record and outscored opponents by a total of 236 to 38. Thomas Leahy was the team captain.

Schedule

References

West Virginia
West Virginia Mountaineers football seasons
West Virginia Mountaineers football